Minaret Manor is a historic mansion house at 844 West Semmes Avenue in Osceola, Arkansas.  Set on a landscape  parcel (reduced by subdivision from the original 15), it is a large -story brick Tudor Revival building.  The lower portions of the house are finished in brick laid in stretcher bond, while gabled upper areas exhibit half-timbering with brick laid in a diagonal basket weave pattern.  At the right front side of the main facade is a three-story turret with conical roof.  The house was built in 1948 for Andrew J. Florida, the principal owner of a real estate empire that extend across eastern Arkansas and western Tennessee.

The house was listed on the National Register of Historic Places in 2017.

See also
 Florida Brothers Building
 National Register of Historic Places listings in Mississippi County, Arkansas

References

Houses on the National Register of Historic Places in Arkansas
Houses completed in 1948
Houses in Mississippi County, Arkansas
National Register of Historic Places in Mississippi County, Arkansas
1948 establishments in Arkansas
Tudor Revival architecture in Arkansas